"Letitia Lerner, Superman's Babysitter" is a comic book story by Kyle Baker, co-written with Liz Glass.

Publication history
The story originally appeared in DC Comics' parallel universe anthology Elseworlds 80-Page Giant #1 (June 1999). Baker drew, colored, lettered and, with Elizabeth Glass, wrote the 10-page story. In the story, the super-toddler climbs into a microwave oven. As a result, most copies were recalled and pulped. DC destroyed all copies of the issue intended for the North American market, though copies were still distributed in Europe.

Collected editions
In May 2001, the story was reprinted in the Bizarro Comics hardcover. A softcover edition of Bizarro Comics followed in April 2003.

Awards
2000 Eisner Award, Best Short Story: "Letitia Lerner, Superman's Babysitter" by Kyle Baker in Elseworlds 80-Page Giant

Also that year, Baker won the Eisner Award for Best Writer/Artist: Humor based on both "Letitia Lerner, Superman's Babysitter" and the DC Comics/Vertigo graphic novel I Die at Midnight.

Notes

References

1999 comics debuts
1999 comics endings
American comics
Censored comics
Child characters in comics
Comics controversies
Eisner Award winners
Female characters in comics
Superman